Virginia Martin (December 2, 1927 – August 27, 2009) was an American actress and singer known for her work on the Broadway stage and on television. She was nominated for the Tony Award for Best Featured  Actress in a Musical in 1963.

Early life
Martin was born in Tennessee, the daughter of Tommy T. and Harville Martin. She had two brothers, Jere and Donald, and was a graduate of the University of Chattanooga.

Theatre

Martin made her Broadway debut during the original run of the musical South Pacific in the role of Ensign Bessie Noonan.

In 1954, Martin was in the chorus of the original Broadway cast for the musical The Pajama Game. In 1955, she was a part of the cast of the musical Ankles Aweigh, again in the chorus. She next appeared in the revue show New Faces of 1956.

In 1958, Martin understudied the lead role of Irene Lovelle under star Vivian Blaine in the musical Say, Darling. In 1961, Martin originated the role of Hedy La Rue in the original Broadway production of How to Succeed in Business Without Really Trying.

In 1963, Martin was nominated for a Tony Award for Best Featured Actress in a Musical for originating the role of Young Belle Poitrine in the musical Little Me.

Martin played the younger version of Belle Poitrine with Nancy Andrews playing the older version of the character. Little Me was revived on Broadway twice, in 1982 and 1998. In the second revival, the character was played by one actress. Little Me was written by Neil Simon and starred Sid Caesar. The show opened on Nov 17, 1962 at the Lunt-Fontanne Theatre and closed on June 29, 1963, after 257 performances.

In February 1965, Martin played the lead role of Emily Kirsten in the musical Bajour that was originated by Nancy Dussault.  Her last appearance on Broadway was in the 1979 musical Carmelina.

Television
Martin made several appearances on Bewitched between 1965 and 1966, notably as Charmaine Leach, the wife of conniving private investigator Charlie Leach (Robert Strauss)and also the role of Roxie Ames.

Death
She died on August 27, 2009, in her native Chattanooga, Tennessee at the age of 81 from undisclosed causes.

External links

References

1927 births
20th-century American singers
2009 deaths
20th-century American actresses
People from Chattanooga, Tennessee
American musical theatre actresses
American television actresses
Actresses from Tennessee
Singers from Tennessee
University of Tennessee at Chattanooga alumni
20th-century American women singers
21st-century American women